Karolina Sztokfisz (born 15 February 1989) is a Polish snowboarder. She was born in Zakopane. She competed in parallel giant slalom and parallel slalom at the FIS Snowboarding World Championships 2013. She competed at the 2014 Winter Olympics in Sochi, in parallel giant slalom and parallel slalom.

References

External links

1989 births
Living people
Sportspeople from Zakopane
Snowboarders at the 2014 Winter Olympics
Snowboarders at the 2018 Winter Olympics
Polish female snowboarders
Olympic snowboarders of Poland
Universiade medalists in snowboarding
Universiade bronze medalists for Poland
Competitors at the 2017 Winter Universiade
Competitors at the 2015 Winter Universiade
21st-century Polish women